Juliano Pescarolo Martins (born 26 August 1974), commonly known as Paquito, is a Brazilian retired footballer who played as a forward.

Football career
Born in Recife, Paquito played in his country with lowly Associação Atlética Internacional (Limeira) and Ceará Sporting Club, also having played four years in Portugal, with S.C. Salgueiros in the first division and C.D. Aves and S.C. Covilhã in the second, in the 1999/early 2000s.

In 2005, before returning home to retire with amateurs of Guarany Sporting Club, Paquito also played in India.

References

External links
CBF data 

1974 births
Living people
Sportspeople from Recife
Brazilian footballers
Association football forwards
Associação Atlética Internacional (Limeira) players
Ceará Sporting Club players
Primeira Liga players
Liga Portugal 2 players
S.C. Salgueiros players
C.D. Aves players
S.C. Covilhã players
Brazilian expatriate footballers
Expatriate footballers in Portugal
Expatriate footballers in India
Brazilian expatriate sportspeople in Portugal
Brazilian expatriate sportspeople in India